Noemi Rüegg (born 19 April 2001) is a Swiss professional racing cyclist, who currently rides for UCI Women's Team Team Jumbo Visma. She rode in the women's road race event at the 2020 UCI Road World Championships.

Major results
2018
 National Junior Road Championships
1st  Time trial
1st  Road race
2019
 National Junior Road Championships
1st  Time trial
1st  Road race
 5th SwissEver GP Cham-Hagendorn
 6th Road race, UCI World Junior Road Championships
2020
 National Road Championships
7th Road race
9th Time trial
2021
 5th Overall Setmana Ciclista Valenciana
1st  Young rider classification
 8th Grand Prix Féminin de Chambéry
2022
 National Under-23 Road Championships
1st  Time trial
1st  Road race
 7th Nokere Koerse voor Dames

References

External links

2001 births
Living people
Swiss female cyclists
Place of birth missing (living people)
21st-century Swiss women